Qendresa Krasniqi (born 28 June 1994) is a Kosovan-born Albanian footballer who plays as a midfielder for Albanian Women's National Championship club KFF Vllaznia Shkodër and the Albania women's national team.

Club career
Krasniqi has played for KFF Hajvalia and Swiss club Yverdon.

International career
Born in Kosovo, Krasniqi is of Albanian descent. She made her debut for Albania in an official match on 2 June 2016, shortly before Kosovo was accepted as a member of both UEFA and FIFA, so she could play for Kosovo despite her previous official appearance for Albania. In March 2017, she played for Kosovo at the Turkish Women's Cup, a friendly competition. A month later, she played three new official matches for Albania, so she became definitely cap-tied to Albania.

International goals
Scores and results list Kosovo's goal tally first

Scores and results list Albania's goal tally first

See also
List of Albania women's international footballers
List of Kosovo women's international footballers

References

External links
 
 

1994 births
Living people
Albanian women's footballers
Women's association football midfielders
KFF Vllaznia Shkodër players
Swiss Women's Super League players
Albania women's international footballers
Albanian expatriate footballers
Albanian expatriate sportspeople in Switzerland
Expatriate women's footballers in Switzerland
Sportspeople from Pristina
Kosovan women's footballers
KFF Hajvalia players
Kosovo women's international footballers
Dual internationalists (women's football)
Kosovan expatriate footballers
Kosovan expatriate sportspeople in Switzerland
Kosovan people of Albanian descent
Sportspeople of Albanian descent